Trepassey Island is a small rocky island 0.6 nautical miles (1.1 km) southeast of Stonington Island in Neny Bay, off the west coast of Graham Land. Several islands were roughly charted in the area by the British Graham Land Expedition (BGLE), 1934–1937, and by the United States Antarctic Service (USAS), 1939–1941. They were surveyed in 1947 by the Falkland Islands Dependencies Survey (FIDS) and named for the M.V. Trepassey, ship used by the FIDS in establishing a base on Stonington Island in 1946.

See also 
 List of Antarctic and sub-Antarctic islands

Islands of Graham Land
Fallières Coast